Paul Briggs (born December 17‚ 1974) is an American animator and voice actor. He is best known for working for the Walt Disney Animation Studios as a head of story on films such as Frozen, Big Hero 6, Zootopia and Raya and the Last Dragon.

 Early life 
Briggs was born on December 17, 1974 in San Antonio, Texas and went to Kansas City Art Institute in Kansas City, Missouri.

 Career 
Briggs started his career by an internship at the Walt Disney Animation Studios in 1997 and worked in the animated film Hercules as a visual effects artist.

In 2009, Briggs worked as a story artist in the animated film The Princess and the Frog, which released on December 11, 2009. He also provided the inaudible voice of Two Fingers, a character who was part of a bumbling trio of Cajun frog hunters.

In 2013, he worked on the animated film Frozen as a head of story, which released on November 27, 2013. He also voiced the character Marshmallow.

In 2014, Briggs again worked as the storyboard supervisor in the animated film Big Hero 6, which released on November 7, 2014. He also voiced the minor character Yama.

In 2018 it was revealed that Briggs would be directing with Dean Wellins a new original film for Walt Disney Animation Studios with Dragon Empire as a tentative title, and would be released at any time from 2020. On August 24, 2019 at D23 Expo this information was confirmed, now titled Raya and the Last Dragon'', to be released on November 25, 2020. The date was later changed to March 12, 2021 due to the COVID-19 pandemic.

Filmography

Feature films

Short films

Television

Video Games

Documentaries

Other Credits

References

External links 
 

Living people
Animators from Texas
Visual effects artists
American storyboard artists
American male voice actors
Artists from San Antonio
Male actors from San Antonio
Kansas City Art Institute alumni
Walt Disney Animation Studios people
1974 births